The National Comedy Center is an American museum dedicated to comedy. The museum and its archives are located in Lucille Ball’s hometown of Jamestown, New York. The museum documents the history of comedy and the artists, producers, writers, cartoonists, and other notable figures who have influenced its development in the US. It was designated as the United States' official cultural institution and museum dedicated to comedy by the United States Congress on February 26, 2019.

The museum includes more than 50 immersive experiences through comedy history, from early vaudeville acts to viral memes. Visitors have a ‘humor profile’ created on entry and stored on an RFID wristband called a ‘Laugh Band’. Content is then presented according to individual tastes, from broad slapstick to edgy satire. Along with educational games and competitions, guests can also create their own comedic content with interactive activities like performing stand-up, recreating iconic funny faces, and creating their own comic strip.

The center opened in August 2018. The National Comedy Center began as the Lucille Ball-Desi Arnaz Museum, which is now located a few blocks away.

Entertainment industry support 
The entertainment industry supports the National Comedy Center with donations of materials related to famous persons in comedy. Individual donors include Dan Aykroyd, the Shelley Berman estate, the Smothers Brothers, The Lenny Bruce Memorial Foundation, Carol Burnett, Kelly Carlin and the George Carlin estate, the Andy Kaufman Memorial Trust, the Harpo Marx Family, the Harold Ramis Family, Carl Reiner, the Garry Shandling Estate, Jerry Seinfeld, the Betty White estate, and Lily Tomlin. Entertainment companies have provided items from their archives, including Desilu Too, NBC Universal, Paramount Pictures, and Warner Brothers. Through a partnership with the Elkhorn Valley Museum in Norfolk, Nebraska, the center shares management of the Johnny Carson archive.

Additionally, the center's advisory board includes members of the comedy industry, including Carl Reiner (2018-2020), Lewis Black, Paula Poundstone, W. Kamau Bell, George Schlatter, Laraine Newman, Jim Gaffigan, Pete Docter, Kelly Carlin, George Shapiro (succeeded by Amy Poehler after Shapiro's death), Rain Pryor, Paul Feig, Kitty Bruce, Robert Klein, David Steinberg, Violet Ramis Stiel, Mark Russell, Alan Zweibel, Robin Zweibel, Paul Provenza, Joan Dangerfield, Jeff Abraham, and Stephen J. Morrison.

Recognition 
In June 2019, the National Comedy Center was named one of the "100 Reasons to Love America" by People magazine.

In August 2019, the National Comedy Center was named one of the "World's Greatest Places" – one of "100 new and newly noteworthy destinations to experience right now" and one of only nine attractions to visit in the United States by TIME magazine.

In January 2019, the National Comedy Center was named by USA Today 10Best as a "Best New Attraction" in the country, ranking #2 out of 20 new attractions, and chosen as the #1 museum and #1 ticketed attraction.

In September 2018, Condé Nast Traveler called the National Comedy Center "One of the best museums in the country."

Comedy Education and Preservation 
The National Comedy Center has collaborated with dozens of artists and estates to preserve materials that represent comedy's significant artistic, social, and political contributions to American culture including collections illustrating the careers of artists like George Carlin, Lucille Ball, Lenny Bruce, The Smothers Brothers and more.

Within the Comedy Center's museum galleries, more than 50 interactive exhibits and immersive experiences present the history of the art form from its origins to the present day – using archival documents, artifacts, and media as their core.

Its educational programming on the art form has featured Tiffany Haddish, George Lopez, Margaret Cho, Norman Lear, Rain Pryor (daughter of Richard Pryor), Jay Leno, Kenan Thompson, Gabriel Iglesias, Jimmy Fallon, Lin-Manuel Miranda, "Weird Al" Yankovic, and many more. In April 2020, the center launched the "National Comedy Center Anywhere" online platform featuring content directly from its interactive comedy exhibits, including: exclusive interviews and online programs with comedians, directors, writers, producers, and creators on the comedic craft.

In March 2021, the museum's archives were renamed "The National Comedy Center’s Carl Reiner Department of Archives and Preservation."  It was simultaneously announced that this would be the official repository of Carl Reiner's archives. Reiner was an early supporter of the center.

See also 
Lucille Ball
Lucie Arnaz

References

External links
 Official Web Site

American comedy
Jamestown, New York
Museums in Chautauqua County, New York
Buildings and structures in Chautauqua County, New York
Museums established in 2018
Comedy Center